"Supersonic" is a song by the English rock band Oasis, released as their debut single on 5 April 1994. It appeared on their debut studio album, Definitely Maybe (1994). The single reached number 31 on the UK Singles Chart, 22 on the UK Indie Singles Chart and 11 on the US Billboard Modern Rock Tracks chart. Two music videos were produced for the song.

"Supersonic" was written by lead guitarist Noel Gallagher and recorded in one session at the Pink Museum Studio (now the Motor Museum) in Liverpool, England in mid-December 1993. It was produced by Oasis and producer Mark Coyle, with no additional production through producer Owen Morris. Brothers Chris and Tony Griffiths of the Liverpool-based rock band, the Real People, also co-produced the song, but are uncredited. However, Tony is credited as a backing vocalist on the song.

Writing
"Supersonic" was written and recorded in a single day at the Pink Museum Studio in Liverpool, on 19 December 1993. It was produced by Oasis with their live sound engineer, Mark Coyle. Guitarist Noel Gallagher claimed he wrote the song in half an hour, while his studio colleagues were taking a break from recording to eat a Chinese takeaway. Rather than joining them, Noel remained in the studio backroom working on his guitar riff and finished writing before they returned. Guitarist Paul "Bonehead" Arthurs recalled: 

According to Noel, "Supersonic" was the only Oasis single written in the studio after another song, "Bring It on Down", was discarded. Although Noel is credited as the sole songwriter, he revealed in the Definitely Maybe 2004 documentary that Bonehead and bassist Paul "Guigsy" McGuigan helped him write the chords.

In 2010, drummer Tony McCarroll wrote in his book The Truth: "Now, I know that Noel is the main songwriter for Oasis, but there were many instances like this where the band as a whole – and The Real People too – were integral to the composition of a song." McCarroll also recounted that Noel did not want to credit the brothers Chris and Tony Griffiths of the Real People as co-producers for "Supersonic" or feature the band themselves as a guest act on any future Oasis performance, leading to a verbal altercation between Noel and singer Liam Gallagher as well as constant problems with the rest of the band members.

Recording
Following a short local tour with the Verve, Oasis performed at the Krazy House club in Liverpool, supporting the Real People, on 16 December 1993. After the gig, they booked sessions at the Pink Museum with Coyle and engineer Dave Scott for a few days, funded by £300 per day, to record "Bring It on Down" for release as their then-upcoming debut single, at the request of Creation Records owner Alan McGee. However, according to Noel, the intended song recording was abandoned due to a disagreement over McCarroll's drumming. He said: "It would become apparent that session didn't work because our drummer at the time wasn't the most consistent from one fucking bar to the next, never mind one day to the next."

According to Scott, Oasis attempted to record a studio version for "I Will Believe", but he dismissed the result because it sounded like an early 1980s indie pop song. Instead, after unsuccessful attempts to record "I Will Believe", Noel wrote a new song, "Take Me Away", in less than five minutes, and recorded it acoustically in 15 minutes. Noel played an Epiphone acoustic guitar with a half pint glass, creating a slide guitar sound that Coyle overdubbed through a Roland Space Echo before Scott mixing the track in another five minutes.

On the last day of the sessions after recording "Take Me Away", Oasis began jamming together, attempting to work on an instrumental they had played as a warm-up during the session of "Bring It on Down" and which would become "Supersonic". The jam session began with McCarroll playing a "lazy" drumbeat, which was quickly followed by Bonehead playing rhythm guitar and Liam rattling his tambourine over the beat. Noel soon joined them and played a guitar melody over the rhythm. Meanwhile, Scott asked the Griffiths brothers, who were present at the sessions, to give Oasis musical and technical advice. Instead of recording B-side songs, Tony Griffiths suggested them to develop this instrumental because it has the makings of a hit single.

After Tony's suggestion, Noel went to the corner and quickly wrote down the lyrics, and then Oasis began recording "Supersonic". To record the song, Scott had to remove a take of "I Will Believe" because he did not have a spare tape. Bonehead used a Gibson SG guitar owned by Scott and a Marshall JCM900 amplifier owned by Chris Griffiths. Noel played an Epiphone Les Paul guitar through a Watkins Dominator MKIII combo amp. For Noel's lead guitar, Scott added additional overdubs by placing the amp in the studio's stone room with close-and-distance microphones and slightly speeding up the tape to thicken the guitar tone over the track. Scott removed McCarroll's hi-hats to record tambourine and handclaps tracks.

After recording the backing tracks, Liam recorded his vocals in one single take, with Noel guiding him and Scott using a Lexicon PCM70 reverb and TC-2290 delay on the vocals. Tony contributed five layers of backing vocals to the song, influenced by the Beatles' harmony vocal style. According to Scott, "Supersonic" was recorded and mixed in 11 hours, while Noel said it took eight hours to be completed. Although it was originally based as a demo, it was never re-recorded, and this refers to producer Owen Morris, who later reworked on some other tracks on Definitely Maybe prior to its release. After the recording was finished, "Supersonic" was introduced to McGee as a potential alternate single; he was impressed.

Composition

Music
"Supersonic" has been classified as a rock, Britpop, and alternative rock song, with elements of neo-psychedelia and American grunge music. It contains Blur-like vocals, "brief but smashing" guitar riffs, "catchy melodic" chorus and "simplistic" lyrics urging to "be yourself." Along with the Definitely Maybe song, "Live Forever", the basic rock rhythm of "Supersonic" is reminiscent of early 1970s music.

The song is played in the key of A major in a  time signature with a tempo of 104 beats per minute (BPM), while Liam's vocals span a range of E4 to F5. The chord progression follows a sequence of Fm11–Asus2–B7. As with "Bring It on Down", the power chord sequence of "Supersonic" was heavily influenced by Nirvana's Nevermind (1991); according to author Alex Niven, Noel adapted Kurt Cobain's guitar technique (specifically in the Nevermind hits "Smells Like Teen Spirit" and "Come as You Are") by adding phaser effects for his overdubbed lead guitar to produce a "swirling, underwater" guitar sound.

"Supersonic" begins with a simple drumbeat played by McCarroll, followed by an arpeggiated guitar riff played by Noel. During the intro, Noel produces a pick scrape guitar effect; Scott suggested this technique after being dissatisfied with McCarroll's drum intro. According to Scott, he wanted it to sound like the intro to Peter Gabriel's 1980 song "Intruder", but Noel ended up producing a sound that was "slightly different and quicker." Noel's guitar solo has a striking resemblance to the opening riff of "My Sweet Lord" (1970) by George Harrison, with a slightly different guitar harmony. However, Noel has denied deliberately copying it.

Lyrics

The lyrics are often regarded as a distillation of nonsense poetry, with doggerel rhymes at the end of multiple lines throughout the song, such as "I'm feeling supersonic / Give me gin and tonic", "He lives under a waterfall / Nobody can ever hear him call", "I know a girl called Elsa / She's into Alka-Seltzer", "And she makes me laugh / I got her autograph", "She done it with a doctor, on a helicopter" and "She's sniffing in a tissue, selling the Big Issue".

According to Noel, "Supersonic" is about "some fucking nine-stone geezer who got Charlie'd off his nut one night...it's not about anything. It's just about a feeling, you just get up and play it." The opening verse "I need to be myself / I can't be no-one else" is often interpreted as a statement by Oasis of their foray into music industry.

Most of the lyrics were inspired by the few days Noel experienced while Oasis were in Liverpool. For example, the lyric "Can I ride with you in your BMW?" was inspired by Tony Griffiths' car spotted by Noel. Noel also drew inspiration for the lyric "I know a girl called Elsa / She's into Alka-Seltzer" from Scott's Rottweiler female dog, Elsa, who was suffering from flatulence while the band were working in the studio.

Release
"Supersonic" was released as a single in Ireland on 5 April 1994, in the UK on 11 April and in the US on 11 September. It was included as the sixth track on Oasis's debut album Definitely Maybe, released on 29 August 1994. The UK single was released by Creation on CD, 12 and 7-inch vinyls, and peaked at number 31 on the UK Singles Chart, the band's second lowest-peaking single after "Half the World Away", which peaked at number 56 in November 2015. However, "Supersonic" sold over 240,000 copies, making it their 14th biggest-selling single in the UK, even outselling their 2002 number one single "The Hindu Times" and their 2005 number one hits "Lyla" and "The Importance of Being Idle".

NME named "Supersonic" the "Single of the Week" in its issue of 9 April 1994; the magazine included it on its compilation Singles of the Week 1994, released in January 1995. "Supersonic" was Oasis's first single to chart in the US; it entered the Billboard Modern Rock Tracks chart at number 33 in early October 1994 and peaked at number 11 on 10 December. By the end of October 1994, "Supersonic" was played on 38 US radio stations. By the end of 1994, the song became the most track played on the WENZ Cleveland radio station. "Supersonic" was included on the band's greatest hits albums Stop the Clocks (2006) and Time Flies... 1994–2009 (2010).

Cover
The cover depicts the band and their instruments at Monnow Valley Studios in Wales. Photographer Michael Spencer discussed the cover art in an interview:

Music video
There are two music videos for the song. In the UK version the band is playing at a roof of a hotel near King's Cross Station. The US version shows the band driving a car and playing in a hemispherical structure, nearly identical to the "Some Might Say" video.

Other appearances
The song appeared on Rock Band on 1 September 2009 as a live version.

The song's title was used for Oasis: Supersonic, a 2016 documentary about the band by director Mat Whitecross.

Track listings
All tracks are written by Noel Gallagher, except "Shakermaker" written by Gallagher, Roger Cook, Roger Greenaway, Bill Backer and Billy Davis.

 UK single and European maxi-single (CD)
 Australian single (CD, cassette)
 "Supersonic" – 4:46
 "Take Me Away" – 4:34
 "I Will Believe" (live) – 3:46
 "Columbia" (white label demo) – 5:24

 UK single (12")
 "Supersonic" – 4:46
 "Take Me Away" – 4:34
 "I Will Believe" (live) – 3:46

 UK single and French jukebox single (7")
 European single (CD)
 "Supersonic" – 4:41
 "Take Me Away" – 4:29

 Japanese EP (CD)
 "Supersonic" – 4:42
 "Shakermaker" – 5:10
 "Columbia" (white label demo) – 5:26
 "Alive" (8-track demo) – 3:57
 "D'Yer Wanna Be a Spaceman?" – 2:41
 "I Will Believe" (live) – 3:47

 US promo (CD)
 "Supersonic" (edit) – 3:40
 "Supersonic" (LP version) – 4:40

 US single (cassette)
 "Supersonic" – 4:43
 "Slide Away" – 6:32

Personnel
Credits adapted from the CD single liner notes, except where noted:

Oasis 
 Liam Gallagher lead vocals, tambourine
 Noel Gallagher lead guitars, scrape effects
 Paul Arthurs rhythm guitar
 Paul McGuigan bass guitar
 Tony McCarroll drums

Additional musicians
 Tony Griffiths  backing vocals

Technical
 Oasis production
 Mark Coyle production; mixing
 Dave Scott engineering
 Owen Morris mastering 
 Vlado Meller mastering 
 Ian Cooper remastering 

Sleeve cover
 Brian Cannon  sleeve design, art direction
 Michael Spencer Jones photography

Charts

Weekly charts

Year-end charts

Certifications

Notes and references

Footnotes

Citations

Sources

External links
 

Oasis (band) songs
1994 debut singles
1994 songs
Creation Records singles
Epic Records singles
Psychedelic songs
Song recordings produced by Liam Gallagher
Song recordings produced by Noel Gallagher
Songs written by Noel Gallagher